Remy Zero is the self-titled 1996 debut album by Remy Zero, and was produced for Geffen Records. The band recorded it after moving to Los Angeles, where many of them suffered from homelessness and drug abuse. The album received very little attention despite Radiohead having added Remy Zero to their tour after hearing Remy Zero's original demos that appeared on KCRW, a radio station in Santa Monica.

Track listing

Credits
High-hat - Stewart Copeland (tracks 7) 
Engineer [Mix] - Frankie Blue 
Mastered By - Bob Ludwig 
Mixed By - Remy Zero, Ronnie S. Champagne* (tracks: 6+8) 
Performer - Cedric Lemoyne, Cinjun Tate, Jeffrey Cain, Shelby Tate 
Performer [Additional Musician] - Amiel Morris, Joe Ippolito, Joey Waronker, Louis Schefano, Martin Tillman, Steven Morris 
Producer - Remy Zero 
Recorded By - Eric Janko, Remy Zero, Ronnie S. Champagne

References

External links
RemyZero.com

1996 debut albums
Remy Zero albums
Geffen Records albums